internationally known as Bust-a-Move, is a 1994 tile-matching puzzle arcade game developed and published by Taito. It is based on the 1986 arcade game Bubble Bobble, featuring characters and themes from that game. Its characteristically cute Japanese animation and music, along with its play mechanics and level designs, made it successful as an arcade title and spawned several sequels and ports to home gaming systems.

Gameplay

At the start of each round, the rectangular playing arena contains a prearranged pattern of colored "bubbles". At the bottom of the screen, the player controls a device called a "pointer", which aims and fires bubbles up the screen. The color of bubbles fired is randomly generated and chosen from the colors of bubbles still left on the screen.

The objective of the game is to clear all the bubbles from the arena without any bubble crossing the bottom line. Bubbles will fire automatically if the player remains idle. After clearing the arena, the next round begins with a new pattern of bubbles to clear. The game consists of 32 levels. The fired bubbles travel in straight lines (possibly bouncing off the sidewalls of the arena), stopping when they touch other bubbles or reach the top of the arena. If a bubble touches identically-colored bubbles, forming a group of three or more, those bubbles—as well as any bubbles hanging from them—are removed from the field of play, and points are awarded. After every few shots, the "ceiling" of the playing arena drops downwards slightly, along with all the bubbles stuck to it. The number of shots between each drop of the ceiling is influenced by the number of bubble colors remaining. The closer the bubbles get to the bottom of the screen, the faster the music plays and if they cross the line at the bottom then the game is over.

Release
Two different versions of the original game were released. Puzzle Bobble was originally released in Japan only in June 1994 by Taito, running on Taito B System hardware (with the preliminary title "Bubble Buster"). Then, 6 months later in December, the international Neo Geo version of Puzzle Bobble was released. It was almost identical aside from being in stereo and having some different sound effects and translated text.

Reception

In Japan, Game Machine listed the Neo Geo version of Puzzle Bobble on their February 15, 1995 issue as being the second most-popular arcade game at the time. It went on to become Japan's second highest-grossing arcade printed circuit board (PCB) software of 1995, below Virtua Fighter 2. In North America, RePlay reported the Neo Geo version of Puzzle Bobble to be the fourth most-popular arcade game in February 1995.

Reviewing the Super NES version, Mike Weigand of Electronic Gaming Monthly called it "a thoroughly enjoyable and incredibly addicting puzzle game". He considered the two player mode the highlight, but also said that the one player mode provides a solid challenge. GamePro gave it a generally negative review, saying it "starts out fun but ultimately lacks intricacy and longevity." They elaborated that in one player mode all the levels feel the same, and that two player matches are over too quickly to build up any excitement. They also criticized the lack of any 3D effects in the graphics. Next Generation reviewed the SNES version of the game, and stated that "It's very simple, using only the control pad and one button to fire, and it's addictive as hell."

A reviewer for Next Generation, while questioning the continued viability of the action puzzle genre, admitted that the game is "very simple and very addictive". He remarked that though the 3DO version makes no significant additions, none are called for by a game with such simple enjoyment. GamePros brief review of the 3DO version commented, "The move-and-shoot controls are very responsive and the simple visuals and music are well done. This is one puzzler that isn't a bust." Edge magazine ranked the game 73rd on their 100 Best Video Games in 2007. IGN rated the SNES version 54th in its Top 100 SNES Games.

Legacy
The simplicity of the concept has led to many clones, both commercial and otherwise. 1996's Snood replaced the bubbles with small creatures and has been successful in its own right. Worms Blast was Team 17's take on the concept. On September 24, 2000, British game publisher Empire Interactive released a similar game, Spin Jam, for the original PlayStation console. Mobile clones include Bubble Witch Saga and Bubble Shooter. Frozen Bubble is a free software clone. For Bubble Bobble's 35th anniversary, Taito launched Puzzle Bobble VR: Vacation Odyssey on the Oculus Quest and Oculus Quest 2, later coming to PlayStation 4 and PlayStation 5 as Puzzle Bobble 3D: Vacation Odyssey in 2021.

Puzzle Bobble Everybubble! 
On August 25, 2022, a new game titled Puzzle Bobble Everybubble! was announced for Nintendo Switch, scheduled for a release on May 23, 2023. The game will also come with an extra mode called "Puzzle Bobble vs. Space Invaders", where up to four players can work together to erase bubble-encased invaders before they reach the player while only being able to aim straight up.

Notes

References

External links

1994 video games
3DO Interactive Multiplayer games
ACA Neo Geo games
Arcade video games
Square Enix franchises
Bubble Bobble
Head-to-head arcade video games
IOS games
Kinesoft games
Microcabin games
Mobile games
Multiplayer and single-player video games
Neo Geo games
Neo Geo CD games
PlayStation 4 games
Puzzle video games
Game Gear games
SNK games
Split-screen multiplayer games
Super Nintendo Entertainment System games
Taito arcade games
Taito B System games
Video games scored by Tamayo Kawamoto
Windows games
WonderSwan games
Xbox 360 Live Arcade games
Xbox One games
Video games developed in Japan
Hamster Corporation games